James Finn Garner (born 1961) is an American writer and satirist based in Chicago. He is the author of Politically Correct Bedtime Stories, Politically Correct Holiday Stories, Apocalypse Wow, "Once Upon A More Enlightened Time" and May 2007 "Recut Madness" (www.jamesfinngarner.com)

Garner graduated from Divine Child High School and the University of Michigan, where he won a Hopwood Award for one of his short plays. Politically Correct Bedtime Stories, Garner's first book, has sold more than 2.5 million copies in the U.S. and has been translated into 20 languages. It spent 65 weeks on The New York Times Best Seller list.

References

External links
 Official website

American comedy writers
Writers from Chicago
University of Michigan alumni
Hopwood Award winners
Place of birth missing (living people)
1961 births
Living people
People from Dearborn, Michigan